Walter Kuss (born 7 May 1965 in Furtwangen) is a German cross-country skier who competed from 1988 to 1995. He finished seventh in the 4 × 10 km relay at the 1988 Winter Olympics in Calgary, Alberta, Canada.

Kuss' best finish at the FIS Nordic World Ski Championships was 11th in the 15 km event at Lahti in 1989. His best World Cup finish was 13th in a 15 km event in Switzerland in 1990.

Kuss's best individual career finish was second in a 10 km Continental Cup event in Switzerland in 1994.

Cross-country skiing results
All results are sourced from the International Ski Federation (FIS).

Olympic Games

World Championships

World Cup

Season standings

References

External links

Olympic 4 x 10 km relay results: 1936-2002 

1965 births
Cross-country skiers at the 1988 Winter Olympics
German male cross-country skiers
Olympic cross-country skiers of West Germany
Living people
People from Schwarzwald-Baar-Kreis
Sportspeople from Freiburg (region)